Castiglione di Sicilia (Sicilian: Castigghiuni di Sicilia) is a comune (municipality) in the Metropolitan City of Catania in Sicily, southern Italy.
 
It borders the following municipalities: Adrano, Belpasso, Biancavilla, Bronte, Calatabiano, Francavilla di Sicilia, Gaggi, Graniti, Linguaglossa, Maletto, Malvagna, Mojo Alcantara, Motta Camastra, Nicolosi, Piedimonte Etneo, Randazzo, Roccella Valdemone, Sant'Alfio, Taormina, Zafferana Etnea.

Passopisciaro

Nowadays Passopisciaro has a population of about 500 but in years gone by the population was as high as 1,500 people. The village can be reached by taking the SS120 Roman road from Fiumefreddo di Sicilia, or by the Circumetnea Railway. Passopisciaro's main industry is wine making, vineyards can be found scattered throughout the entire region.

Twin towns
Castiglione di Sicilia is twinned with:

  Killarney, Ireland
  Tauves, France

References

Cities and towns in Sicily